TTE may refer to:

Medicine and science
 Transthoracic echocardiogram
 1,1,2-Trichloro-1,2,2-trifluoroethane, chemical compound

Transport
 Babullah Airport, Indonesia (by IATA code)
 Travelling ticket examiner, the title of train conductors in India.

Other
 This Toilet Earth, a heavy metal album
 Time-Triggered Ethernet, a fault-tolerant strategy for synchronized time in Ethernet networks
 TotalEnergies, traded on the New York Stock Exchange and the Euronext Paris as TTE
 Toyota Team Europe